Rauma Maritime Museum is a museum in Rauma, Finland held by Rauma Maritime Museum Foundation. The museum opened in the former Maritime School in 2004.

References

Maritime museums in Finland
Rauma, Finland
Museums in Satakunta
Museums established in 2004
2004 establishments in Finland